Crimes at the Dark House  (originally titled The Woman in White) is a (1940) British film directed by George King starring Tod Slaughter, Sylvia Marriott and Hilary Eaves. It is loosely based on the 1860 novel The Woman in White by Wilkie Collins.

Plot summary
In this lurid melodrama Tod Slaughter plays a villain who murders the wealthy Sir Percival Glyde in the gold fields of Australia and assumes his identity in order to inherit his estate in England. On arriving in England he schemes to marry an heiress for her money and, with the connivance of the enigmatic Count Fosco, embarks on a killing spree of all who suspect him to be an imposter and get in the way of his plans to be the Lord of the Manor.

Cast
Tod Slaughter as The False Percival Glyde
Sylvia Marriott as Laurie Fairlie / Anne Catherick
Hilary Eaves as Marion Fairlie
Geoffrey Wardwell as Paul Hartwright
Hay Petrie as Dr. Isidor Fosco
Margaret Yarde as Mrs. Bullen
Rita Grant as Jessica, the Maid
David Horne as Frederick Fairlie
Elsie Wagstaff as Mrs. Catherick
David Keir as Lawyer Merriman

References

External links

1940 films
1940 crime drama films
British crime drama films
1940s English-language films
British black-and-white films
Films based on British novels
Films based on works by Wilkie Collins
Films directed by George King
Films set in country houses
Films set in England
Films scored by Jack Beaver
Films shot at Station Road Studios, Elstree
1940s British films